The Mouse and the Mask is an album by Danger Doom, a collaboration between the hip hop artists Danger Mouse and MF Doom. It was released on October 11, 2005, by the independent punk label Epitaph Records in the United States. It was also released by Lex Records in the UK on October 17, 2005, with different cover art.

Concept and history 
The album is composed almost entirely of raps by MF Doom, performed over beats created by Danger Mouse sampling music from various television shows airing on Cartoon Network's programming block Adult Swim. The album was heavily promoted by the network prior to its release.

"Sofa King" was released as a 12-inch single on November 4, 2005, and was followed by "Old School" on July 10, 2006. A video for "A.T.H.F." has also been made.

Comedian Dave Chappelle created an iTunes Celebrity Playlist and selected the Danger Doom track "Mince Meat" for his Block Party Picks. He stated, "Two very consistently good artists collaborate to make my head nod. DOOM, Mouse - Thank You. Wherever you are, nice album." MF Doom mentions Chappelle in the song "Peoples, Places, and Things" (called "Name Dropping" on his CD "Live from Planet X"). Doom says "Rap cats act brave as hell/Get on the mic and turn 'Gangsta!' on some 'yeah, see' like Dave Chappelle", in reference to a bit Chappelle performed in his stand up "Killin' Them Softly".

MF Doom disses MF Grimm in this album by referring to the Monsta Island Czars (aka M.I.C.) as 'Midgets Into Crunk' in the song "El Chupa Nibre" (on the paraphrased remix version the line is changed to 'Monkeys Into Crime'). Grimm responded by releasing an entire Doom diss track, titled "Book of Daniel" (which concludes his 2006 triple album American Hunger), in which he mainly accuses Doom of having sold out.

"Old School" features a mix of Keith Mansfield's song "Funky Fanfare," and "Space Ho's" sample Mansfield's "Morning Broadway."

The rap that Meatwad performs at the end of "Bada Bing" is a verse from "Beef Rapp", the first song on MF Doom's album MM..Food.

As of November 6, 2008 the album has sold 170,081 copies.

Reception 

The Mouse and the Mask was well received by critics, scoring 81 out of 100 on the review aggregator Metacritic, indicating "universal acclaim". Spin ranked it 25 on their "40 Best Albums Of 2005", and said that "together, these two dudes are more animated than the cartoon characters who pop up on this disc.". Entertainment Weekly gave it an A−, calling it a "hip-hop tour-de-farce". Magnet said "wading deep into hip hop's rich history, they deliver a record that conjures the classics without sounding willfully retro". The Wire called it "[a] frenetic comedy both above and of a kind with its fratboy origins, admirably absurdist in some respects and coolly demented in others" and Vibe similarly said "[a] headphone-friendly soundtrack...[of] deliciously demented narratives." Mojo gave it 3 out of 5 stars, noting "the stoned, late-night hilarity is grounded by some deft soundtrack-funk production from Dangermouse..."

Track listing 
Notes:
All songs produced by Danger Mouse
All songs written by Daniel Dumile and Brian Burton except:
"The Mask" by Daniel Dumile, Dennis Coles and Brian Burton
"Benzie Box" by Daniel Dumile, Brian Burton and Thomas DeCarlo Callaway
"Old School" by Daniel Dumile, Brian Burton and Talib Kweli Greene

Release details

Chart positions

Personnel 
 Mark Linkous – bass guitar (track 3)
 Money Mark – keyboards (track 9)
 Jason DeMarco – executive producer
 Michael Schmelling – photography
 Virginia Consea – photography 
 George Ella Rose – artwork
 Jacob Escobedo – artwork
 Gene Grimaldi – mastering

References 

2005 debut albums
Adult Swim albums
Albums produced by Danger Mouse (musician)
Danger Mouse (musician) albums
Epitaph Records albums
Lex Records albums
MF Doom albums
Concept albums